Cosplay Fetish Battle Drones (formerly titled Struggled Reagans) is an American science fiction comedy film that was the first feature film by director and screenwriter Gregg Golding. The movie had its world premiere on December 11, 2013 at Another Hole In The Head International Genre Film Festival, and is a surrealistic parody of Japanese tokusatsu series such as Power Rangers and Kamen Rider.

Synopsis
Six teenagers suffer from a series of emotional traumas, which coalesce to create a tumor in the collective unconscious. They are then summoned to the home of one of the teenagers (Evie, played by Carly Jean, and based on the character of the same name from the television sitcom Out of This World) where her alien father, (based on the character Troy, also from Out of This World, and portrayed by hip hop artist Dapwell) gives them powers based on their respective traumas. The teenagers, now known as the Struggled Reagans, search for the tumor in an effort to destroy it. Their efforts are opposed by the Hindu god Garuda, who uses the energy from the tumor to create a number of monsters to oppose them.

The film's plot and characters reference and parody various aspects of popular culture, including most significantly the Japanese tokusatsu genre, and also is laden with philosophical and surrealistic elements.

Cast
Samuel Vasquez as Billy
Leland Mapp as Antoine
Gregg Golding as Jason
Carly Jean as Evie
Liza Moore as Maya
Mathias Parr as Tommy
Dapwell as Dad

Release
The film premiered (under its original title of Struggled Reagans) on December 11, 2013 at San Francisco's Another Hole In The Head International Genre Film Festival.  It has also screened at the Sci-Fi London 2014 film festival.

The film was released on DVD in February, 2015.

References

External links
 
 

2013 films
American science fiction comedy films
2010s science fiction comedy films
2013 comedy films
2010s English-language films
2010s American films